Where the Mind Wants to Go / Where You Let It Go is the third wide-release album from American rock band I the Mighty, released on October 20, 2017 through Equal Vision Records.

Background
The band announced the album on 29 August 2017, with a release date of 20 October 2017. Along with this announcement the band released the video  for the lead single 'Silver Tongues' featuring Tilian Pearson of Dance Gavin Dance.

Track listing

Personnel
Credits from AllMusic.

I the Mighty
 Brent Walsh – rhythm guitar, lead vocals
 Ian Pedigo – lead guitar, backing vocals
 Chris Hinkley – bass guitar, backing vocals
 Blake Dahlinger – drums, percussion

Additional musicians
 Tilian Pearson – Composer, Featured Artist

Artwork
 Davis Ayer - Artwork, Photography

Production
 Neal Avron - Mixing
 Courtney Ballard - Composer, Producer
 Casey Bates - Engineer, Producer
 Kris Crummett - Bass Engineer, Drum Engineering, Mastering, Mixing, Vocal Engineer
 Blake Dahlinger - Producer, Programming
 Eric Palmquist - Composer
 Curtis Peoples - Composer
 Jared Poythress - Additional Production, Composer, Programming
 Dan Sandshaw - A&R

References

I the Mighty albums
2017 albums
Equal Vision Records albums